Dan Leigh Hollow is a valley in Iron County, Utah, United States.

The stream that flows through the hollow empties into the O'Neil Gulch.

Dan Leigh Hollow has the name of Daniel T. Leigh, a pioneer settler.

See also

 List of canyons and gorges in Utah

References

Valleys of Utah
Valleys of Iron County, Utah